Chris Clavin (born Christopher Johnston; August 23, 1973) is an American musician and record label owner from Indiana, United States, with a strict DIY (do-it-yourself) punk ethic. He has been involved in numerous punk bands and ran Plan-It-X Records, a label founded in 1994.

Clavin has been a part of many (primarily pop punk and folk punk) bands, including bands that have toured the world and been influential in the DIY punk scene.

Clavin was accused of sexual misconduct over social media in 2017.

Bands

Ghost Mice

In 2002, Clavin formed the two-piece folk punk band Ghost Mice with Hannah Jones. It was an American band based in Bloomington, Indiana, United States.  Both members had been in a handful of pop-punk bands together: namely Disarm, The Devil is Electric and Operation: Cliff Clavin. They decided to "turn to the folk side" in the hopes that they could tour more easily and play almost anywhere, and to this end Hannah changed from playing bass to violin.
The following is a quote from Ghost Mice:
We play 100% acoustic. We never use amps or mics (except at Plan-It-X Fest and on and once in Austin, Texas). We have been playing in bands together for about 7 years. We started Ghost Mice in 2002 because we were tired of being restricted. We were tired of having to travel in big vans and depend on amps, PA systems and electricity. With Ghost Mice we can travel very light and we need nothing to play. We often play in back yards or on the street corner in front of the venue. We have toured the United States many times and we toured Europe (Germany, the Netherlands, Denmark, Austria, France, Spain, Belgium, England, Wales, Scotland, and Ireland) by foot. We hitch-hiked and took trains to all of our shows. It was fun and very liberating. We sing a mix of personal and political lyrics, we are anarchist, we are dedicated to the DIY ethic and the struggle to make the world a better place. We play music and travel for fun and to meet new people. Music is our lives. We love travel. We are nice and a little shy.

The band hasn't played a show since the summer of 2017.

Dark Times was released initially in 2017 and re-released on the internet in June 2018.

Chris has also released an EP & full length album as Captain Chaos in 2020, it can be found on the Ghost Mice Bandcamp.

He is still releasing albums under the Ghost Mice moniker on the Ghost Mice Bandcamp as well.

List of bands
Below is a partial list of the bands Clavin has played in:

Last August
Drowners
The Ted Dancin' Machine
Operation: Cliff Clavin
Disarm
Pink Ass Flowers (P.A.F.)
The Trolls
The Coug
The Ground-Ups
I Like Japanese Hardcore
The Sissies
Ghost Mice
The Devil is Electric
Captain Chaos
Helter Skeletor
The Jammy Dodgers
Imperial Can
Long Duck Dong
By Blood
Inky Skulls
Tooth Soup

Solo musical projects 
Clavin started working on solo recordings in the fall of 2004 when he wrote a song and recorded it in the same day to give to someone as a gift. He tried to write and record one song a day. He only made it 8 days. Those 8 songs along with 7 others are on the first album, "May All Liars Burn in Hell". The idea behind his solo projects is to write songs without thinking about them, to be pure in writing and hold nothing back. Occasionally Clavin utilized his friends "Colorblind" Joe, McKayla or others for help. Primarily playing with acoustic guitar or ukulele, he has toured the US West Coast, Midwest, and Europe multiple times.

As Captain Chaos 

When Clavin first started releasing solo songs, he did not want his typical moniker attached to them. Spoonboy (of The Max Levine Ensemble) gave him the name Captain Chaos. Though Clavin did not like the name, it stuck. He released six full-length albums, one split, and appeared on a handful of compilations and other small projects as Captain Chaos before using his real name on his solo work (see further below).

Captain Chaos discography

Early works

Full-length albums

Box set
All six of the full-length albums (and a bonus CDR of cover songs) were available in a hand-crafted wooden box set with hand-made art. These boxes were made by Dan Treiber of Crafty Records. Fifty-one of them were made. The first 25 were made out of recycled 99-year-old barn wood. The second 26 were made out of recycled 1960 Canadian crate wood. The box set became officially available as of April 5, 2007. It is now out of print.

Compilations

As Chris Clavin 
In 2008, Clavin decided to stop releasing songs as Captain Chaos, and instead use his traditional moniker. He began to tour solo again on a small scale, and has released one album so far.

Chris Clavin discography

Full-length albums

Record labels
Clavin's solo projects have appeared on the following record labels (this list excludes compilations and smaller projects)
 Anti-Creative Records
 Big Magic Records
 Boom Boom Tapes
 Crafty Records
 Fall of the West Records
 Plan-It-X Records
 The Scientist and the Duke Records
 Sweet Now Records
 Valiant Death Records
 Rock-it Records

Sexual misconduct allegation 
In 2017, Clavin was accused of sexual assault over social media. Clavin responded, stating, among other things: "I no longer play in any bands. I no longer run a record label or publishing company. I will settle all affairs and orders of course, and pay all outstanding debts and invoices." While he was defended by some close to him, bands he has collaborated with including Kimya Dawson, AJJ, Waxahatchee, Spoonboy and Ramshackle Glory condemned his actions, renounced their work on Plan-It-X Records, and vowed to remove Clavin's work from future printings of split albums. Most of this music remains readily available through a variety of online sources.  Clavin's bandmate in Ghost Mice, Hannah O'Connor, posted the following on Facebook, quoted by PunkNews in response to the allegations: "Since I have been Chris' friend for a long time, I know that he is being accused of things he has not done. I know there are a lot of false allegations, rumors, and lies spreading very fast about him."

See also

List of record labels

References

Further reading 

 

American punk rock singers
Living people
American punk rock guitarists
Musicians from Bloomington, Indiana
Guitarists from Indiana
American male guitarists
Folk punk musicians
Year of birth missing (living people)
American anarchists